Shakan Pitters (born 31 July 1989) is an English professional boxer who held the British light-heavyweight title in 2020.

Professional career
Pitters made his professional debut on 18 March 2017 as a cruiserweight, scoring a four-round points decision (PTS) victory over Remigijus Ziausys at the Holte Suite in Villa Park, Birmingham. he secured three more PTS victories in 2017; Over Jevgenijs Andrejevs in June; Dmitrij Kalinovskij in September; and Jiri Svacina in November.

He began 2018 with a PTS win over Elvis Dube in March, followed by stoppage wins over Kent Kauppinen in May and Imantas Davidaitis in September. In August, Pitters was announced as a contestant in the second edition of the Ultimate Boxxer tournament. The eight-man tournament was contested over 3 rounds, taking place on 2 November at the indigo at The O2 in London. Pitters' first fight of the night came against Sam Smith, winning by unanimous decision (UD), with two judges scoring the bout 30–25 and the third scoring it 29–26. Next up he defeated Georgii Bacon via second-round knockout (KO). His final fight of the night was a UD win against Dec Spelman with scores of 30–26 twice and 29–27, becoming the Ultimate Boxxer II champion.

Following his success in the Ultimate Boxxer, Pitters kicked off 2019 with a first-round KO victory against Norbert Szekeres in March and a six-round PTS win against Dmitrij Kalinovskij in May. His final fight of 2019 was a rematch against newly crowned English light-heavyweight champion Dec Spelman. The bout took place on 14 September 2019 at the York Hall in London, with Pitters defeating Spelman via UD over ten rounds to capture his first professional title. All three judges scored the bout 97–92.

Professional boxing record

References

External links

1989 births
Living people
Boxers from Birmingham, West Midlands
British male boxers
Light-heavyweight boxers
Cruiserweight boxers